Giuseppe Cacciatore (2 December 1945 – 2 March 2023) was an Italian philosopher and historian of philosophy. He was professor emeritus of history of philosophy at the University of Naples Federico II.

Life and career 
Born in Salerno,  Cacciatore graduated in philosophy at the Sapienza University of Rome in 1968, and the same year he became assistant in the faculty of philosophy at the University of Salerno, becoming ordinary professor in 1970. Starting from 1981 he was professor of history of philosophy at the University of Naples Federico II, becoming emeritus in 2017. He also served as president of the class of Moral Sciences of the Accademia Pontaniana between 2017 and 2018, and from 2019 he was a national member of the Accademia dei Lincei.

He was author of a large number of essays and studies, including works about Immanuel Kant, Georg Wilhelm Friedrich Hegel, Giordano Bruno and Benedetto Croce, and collaborated as a columnist with numerous publications. 

A member of Italian Communist Party, Cacciatore briefly served as city councillor for the Performing Arts in his hometown under mayor .  He died in Salerno on 2 March 2023, at the age of 77.

References

External links 
 Giuseppe Cacciatore at Open Library

 

1945 births
2023 deaths 
People from Salerno 
Italian philosophers 
20th-century Italian essayists
Academic staff of the University of Salerno
Academic staff of the University of Naples Federico II
Sapienza University of Rome alumni